Chan Hao-ching and Chan Yung-jan were the defending champions and successfully defended their title, defeating Lucie Hradecká and Kateřina Siniaková in the final, 6–4, 6–2.

Seeds

Draw

References 
 Draw

Taiwan Open - Doubles
WTA Taiwan Open